The climate in Brazil varies considerably from mostly tropical north (the equator traverses the mouth of the Amazon) to temperate zones south of the Tropic of Capricorn (23°26' S latitude).

Temperatures
There is little seasonal variation near the equator other than the rainfall frequency.

There are frosts south of the Tropic of Capricorn during the winter (June–September).

Although most of Brazil lies in the tropics, more than 60 percent of the country's population live in areas which are cooled either by altitude, sea winds or polar fronts. Some coastal cities of Rio de Janeiro, Recife and Salvador can get extremely hot, with temperatures exceeding  in heat waves. For example, Rio reached  on 26 December 2012.

Even so, on occasions polar air massed influence the climate, causing the temperature to drop below . The rainforest town of Cruzeiro do Sul has recorded temperatures below  twice.

The hottest part of Brazil is the northeast, where temperatures of more than 38 °C (100 °F) are frequently recorded during the dry season between May and November.
The cities of São Paulo, Curitiba, Florianópolis and Porto Alegre are known to have a subtropical climate, which is within contrast with central and northern Brazil. Furthermore, it is to note that the winters often are more similar to that of Florida, and temperatures seldom fall below freezing in winter.

Precipitation

Precipitation levels vary widely throughout Brazil. Most of Brazil has moderate rainfall of between  a year, with most of the rain falling in the summer (between December and April) south of the Equator. It is less widely known that, despite high annual precipitation, the Amazon forest has a three- to five-month dry season, the timing of which varies according to location north or south of the equator. For example, the dry season in Boa Vista is different to that of Manaus.

High and relatively regular levels of precipitation in the Amazon contrast sharply with the dryness of the semiarid Northeast, where rainfall is highly erratic and there are severe droughts in cycles averaging seven years. The Northeast is the driest part of the country, with erratic rainfall and crops struggling to grow. For example Quixeramobim receives only 499 mm of rain annually. However, the sertão, a region of semidesert vegetation used primarily for low-density ranching, turns green when there is rain. Most of the Center-West has  of rain per year, with a pronounced dry season in the middle of the year. For example, Campo Grande has a dry season from June to September and a wet season for the rest of the year. In the wet season in cities like Campo Grande, flooding can be a problem because of intense rains that can happen in a short period. Flooding has also been a major issue in cities without a dry season such as Porto Alegre. The South and areas of the East are without a distinct dry season. Brazil has experienced deadly and devastating droughts in some years.

For example, Belém receives  of rainfall annually. The warm weather lets many plants grow here. Most of Brazil has moderate rainfall of between  a year, most of it coming between December and April.

Snowfall

Snow in Brazil often happens in winter in the mountains of Rio Grande do Sul, Santa Catarina, and Paraná, and is rarer at lower elevations. It is possible, but very rare, in the states of São Paulo, Rio de Janeiro, Minas Gerais, and Mato Grosso do Sul. São Joaquim has the most snowy days of any settlement in Brazil.

Snow has been recorded in Curitiba during several years, but has not accumulated significantly since 1975. In 2013, snow hit several municipalities, including Curitiba. Snow has also occurred in Porto Alegre, but is very rare.

Extreme weather

Because the South Atlantic basin is generally not a favorable environment for their development, Brazil has only rarely experienced tropical cyclones. The country's coastal population centers are considered less burdened with the need to prepare for cyclones, as are cities at similar latitudes in the United States and Asia.

Hurricane Catarina is the first and only South Atlantic tropical cyclone to have reached hurricane strength, and impacted Santa Catarina as a Category 2 storm in 2004. It reached sustained wind speeds of 155 km/h (100 mph) and a pressure of 972 millibars. The hurricane damaged shipyards and several crop fields, and poorer people were affected the most. At least 2,000 people became homeless as a result of the storm.

Other weaker subtropical cyclones can also cause damage. In 2015, Subtropical Storm Cari caused flooding and landslides to some cities in Santa Catarina and Rio Grande do Sul. In 2020, the front associated with Subtropical Storm Kurumí played a role in damaging floods and mudslides, with heavy rainfall. Large amounts of rain fell in Greater Belo Horizonte, triggering a landslide which killed three people and left one person missing. Later that year, Subtropical Storm Mani affected the state of Espírito Santo, with landslides leaving over 400 people homeless. In 2021, Subtropical Storm Ubá killed fifteen people and caused flooding and damage. Over 30 municipalities in Bahia decreed a state of emergency because of the storm. In May 2022, Subtropical Storm Yakecan killed two people in Brazil and Uruguay. Because of severed power cables, over 220,000 people were affected by power cuts as a result of the storm.

Climate change

Examples

See also 
 Effects of global warming
 Climate change in Brazil
 Geography of Brazil
 Regional effects of global warming

References

External links 
 https://web.archive.org/web/20101206014542/http://www.brazil.org.uk/brazilinbrief/climate.html
 

 
Brazil